Homosexual relations were legalised in the state of Israel in 1988, and during the 1990s various forms of discrimination were prohibited. Debate has since centred on recognition of same-sex partnerships and the rights they confer, including inheritance, residency, and the adoption of children. The staging of LGBT pride parades has been controversial in some cases.

19th century
In 1858, the Ottoman Empire ruled the area of modern-day Israel and Palestine as part of Ottoman Syria. It abolished its existing sodomy laws in its Penal Code (Article 198) so long as it was consensual and the consenting partner was above the age of consent.

Beginning in 1882, Ashkenazi Jewish migrants from the Russian Empire fled to Ottoman Palestine in a series of waves to escape rising anti-Semitism, encouraged by Perez Smolenskin's suggestion that Jews make aliyah to Israel in large movements. Smolenskin's urging of European Jews could be seen as a precursor to Theodor Herzl's Zionism. It is not known if the growth in nuance for homosexuality began with any of the early Russian settlers, as the territory from which they had migrated had largely been populated with homophobic cultural traits; however, as Jewish Russians were only recently beginning to integrate into mainstream Russian society away from the Pale of Settlement , views on homosexuality likely sharply differed between Jewish intellectuals and religious clerics when migrating to, and establishing the agricultural settlements in the area.

20th century

1900–1950s 

The British Mandate of Palestine was given to Britain in 1923 after the disbandment of the Ottoman Empire following the events of WWI. Now governing a new territory, the British took some interest in the population of Palestine. In terms of sexuality and sexual rights, British involvement began in terms of questionnaires which would question the Palestinian population about their sexual practices and what they considered both unnatural and immoral. It was revealed that in Palestine there existed many ways of “unnatural” sexual expression including sodomy between school boys and acts of lesbian love which were blamed on influences from nearby countries such as Syria and Egypt. Though these acts were not considered horrible to Palestine, they were considered unnatural and immoral to their British colonizers. Thus, throughout British rule of the mandate, Britain would slowly incorporate their homophobic policies into the lives of the Palestinian population. Until 1948, when the British Mandate would be partitioned to give land to the Jewish people, British leaders would encourage the criminalization and punishment of sexual acts that they determined were either unnatural, immoral, or both.  Before the intervention of Britain and in the beginning of their intervention, the Palestinian population knew that acts of homosexuality in regards to both genders existed in their society. They deemed these acts as unnatural to the norm but not as immoral to way of life. After British intervention, the population would begin to criminalize these acts and this criminalization would last into the development of the Israeli State in 1948.

The newly formed government of Israel continued in British tradition with enforcing their laws regarding the criminalization of homosexual relationships as well as other acts that the government deemed immoral or unnatural which included acts of gender fluidity. In the 1950s, an Israeli woman by the name of Rina Natan was arrested for cross dressing, this entailed that she was wearing female clothes while being of biological male gender. The arrest was made on terms of her breaking public order. Later, the government had concluded that they could not charge her for wearing women's clothing and ultimately released her.  After her arrest, she became very vocal in Israel's political sphere in regards to gender and transgender rights, even becoming known as Israel's first transgender rights activist. Specifically, she was protesting the Israeli government's policies and laws that denied her rights to treatment and denied her the appropriate resources to transition between the male to female gender. Denying her specifically on her gender reassignment surgery was Attorney General Haim Cohn who in 1954 was persistent in making sure that Natan would not receive her surgery. Following this, two short years later, Natan severed the penis that she was born with herself. After this, Israeli hospitals were forced to treat her and Rina Natan became Israel's first transgender woman. After her transition, Rina Natan was a woman by gender and in society but the Israeli government never changed the name and gender on her passport, which remained under her birth given male name. Natan would pave the way for gender and transgender rights in Israel. She gave transgender rights a sphere of influence in activism and her actions and story would lead the Israeli government to legally recognize and permit sex reassignment later in 1986.

1960s 
In 1960, Rina Ben-Menahem self-published her first book, "הדווקאים", describing the homosexual and lesbian scene in Israel from her first person acquaintance.

In 1963, Justice Cohn denounced sodomy laws, stating that they were outdated and that consensual sexual acts were neither criminal nor morally wrong. By denouncing these policies, Justice Cohn discouraged authorities from enforcing them.

In 1968, Tel Aviv's first gay bar was opened by Amir Sharon in a private apartment. After this, gay clubs pop up around Israeli metropolitan areas and a secret club gains infamy. (See London Ministores Mall).

1970s 
In 1975, Israel's first organization to protect LGBT rights is established. (See The Aguda – Israel's LGBT Task Force). Alizada, coming from the Hebrew "happy" (aliz) becomes the first LGBT pride march in Israel on September 17, 1977.

1980s 
Shulamit Aloni starts bringing attention to LGBT rights in Israeli law in the beginning of the 1980s. In 1988, under Amendment 22 of Israeli Penal Law, same-sex sexual relations between consenting adults were decriminalized. The 1980s also brought employment discrimination protections to lesbian and gay Israelis.

1990s
 In 1992 legislation was introduced to prohibit employment discrimination on the basis of sexual orientation, with some exemptions for religious organizations.
 In 1993, the Israeli Parliament revised the military rules so that gay, lesbian and bisexual Israelis can serve openly and on an equal footing with their heterosexual counterparts; homosexuals have been allowed to serve openly in the military, including special units.
 The first Pride parade in Tel Aviv took place in 1993.
 MK Yael Dayan makes an impassioned speech before the Knesset for gay and lesbian rights in Israel, quoting Torah passages regarding David's relationship with Jonathan.
 In 1994, unregistered cohabitation was legalized for the first time.
In 1998, Dana International, a trans woman, represented Israel in the Eurovision Song Contest, winning with her song "Diva".

21st century

2000s

2000-2004

Family and relationship rights
 An Israeli family court on March 17, 2002, turned down an application from a lesbian couple to have their partnership union declared legal. The couple was united in a civil ceremony in Germany. The women wanted the court to recognize their partnership as a civil marriage, under Israeli law. The court said that since the women are not recognized as a family under Israeli law, the court is not authorized to rule on their case. A government lawyer who was asked by the court to give a legal opinion on the case on behalf of the Israeli government said that the state objected to granting the request.
 On December 14, 2004, the Nazareth District Court ruled that same-sex couples have the same rights as married couples in inheritance rights. This ruling overturned a Family Court ruling that an elderly man from Kiryat Shmona was not entitled to spousal rights. The man had sought the estate of his late partner, with whom he lived for several decades. The Nazareth judges ruled that the term "man and woman" as spelled out in Israel's inheritance law also includes same sex couples. Judges Nissim Maman and Gabriela Levy, who issued the majority opinion, based their decision on a loose interpretation of the term "partner" as defined in other court rulings, such as those dealing with issues related to employee benefits, and thus applied the interpretation to the inheritance law. The acting president of the Nazareth District Court, Menachem Ben-David, issued the minority opinion, arguing that the legal text should not be interpreted "contrary to the lingual significance." A government spokesperson said the ruling will be appealed.
 In December 2004, the Tel Aviv District Court ruled that the government cannot deport the Colombian partner of a gay Israeli man. The 32-year-old Colombian entered Israel on a visitors visa which has long expired and the Interior Ministry had ordered him deported. His partner is an Israeli citizen and a soldier in the Israel Defense Forces. The couple filed an emergency petition with the Tel Aviv District Court. The men were represented by the Association for Civil Rights in Israel. Judge Uzi Vogelman ruled that the government had acted illegally in attempting to deport the man. In 1999 Supreme Court ruling established that the ministry could not deport foreign nationals married to Israeli citizens. Vogelman's decision extends that to apply to common-law marriages, including same-sex couples.
 In March 2008, Israel's Interior Ministry granted a gay Palestinian from Jenin a rare residency permit to live with his partner of 8 years in Tel Aviv after he said his sexuality put his life in danger in the West Bank.

Other events
In 2001, Pride is first held in Eilat (Eilat Pride).

2005-2009

Family and relationship rights
On January 10, 2005, the Supreme Court ruled that a lesbian couple is able to legally adopt each other's children. During the past 15 years that Tal and Avital Jarus-Hakak have lived together, they have had a total of three children. In November 2005, a groundbreaking court decision in Israel ruled that a lesbian spouse could officially adopt a child born to her current partner by artificial insemination from an anonymous sperm donor; this ruling came despite protests by the minority Orthodox Jewish parliamentary parties.

Following the supreme court ruling, a lesbian couple was allowed to adopt each other's biological children on February 12, 2006. Before that, gay partners of parents were granted guardianship over their partner's children.

On March 10, 2009, the Tel Aviv family court ruled that former Knesset member Uzi Even and his partner, Amit Kama, can legally adopt their 30-year-old foster son, Yossi, making them the first same-sex male couple in Israel whose right of adoption has been legally acknowledged.

On January 29, 2007, following a Supreme Court ruling ordering them to do so, Jerusalem registered its first gay couple, Avi and Binyamin Rose.

Events and incidents

On 30 June 2005, the fourth annual Pride march of Jerusalem took place. It had originally been prohibited by a municipal ban which was cancelled by the court. Many of the religious leaders of Jerusalem's Muslim, Jewish and Christian communities had arrived to a rare consensus asking the municipal government to cancel the permit of the paraders. During the parade, a Haredi Jewish man, Yishai Schlissel, attacked three people with a kitchen knife and was sentenced to 10 years in prison for the crime.

Another parade, this time billed as an international event, was scheduled to take place in the summer of 2005, but was postponed to 2006 due to the stress on police forces during the summer of Israel's unilateral disengagement plan. In 2006, it was again postponed due to the Israel-Hezbollah war. It was scheduled to take place in Jerusalem on 10 November 2006, and caused a wave of protests by Haredi Jews around central Israel; the ugliest incident took place during the 2006 Jerusalem gay pride parade.

The Israel National Police had filed a petition to cancel the parade due to foreseen strong opposition. Later, an agreement was reached to convert the parade into an assembly inside the Hebrew University stadium in Jerusalem. 21 June 2007, the Jerusalem Open House organization succeeded in staging a parade in central Jerusalem after police allocated thousands of personnel to secure the general area. The rally planned afterwards was cancelled due to an unrelated national fire brigade strike which prevented proper permits from being issued.

In 2008 the City of Tel Aviv opened the Municipal LGBT Community Center, the first of its kind in the country.

In August 2009, an armed attacker shot dead two people and injured 15 more in an attack on a lesbian and gay centre in Tel Aviv. The incident has been deplored by many organizations and government officials, such as the Prime Minister of Israel, Benjamin Netanyahu, and President Shimon Peres.

2010s
In July 2015, Yishai Schlissel, an Orthodox Jew released from prison after spending 10 years in jail for stabbing participants in a 2005 LGBT pride event in Jerusalem, attacked six marchers with a knife. One of the victims, a teenage girl named Shira Banki, died of her wounds. A central square in Jerusalem is to be renamed "Tolerance Square" in memory of Banki.

References

Further reading 

 Israel: LGBTQ History from A Wider Bridge: https://awiderbridge.org/today-in-lgbt-israel-history/
"Parliament legalizes homosexuality in Israel - March 23, 1988": Rosenberg, Carol (March 23, 1988). "Parliament legalizes homosexuality in Israel". United Press International, Inc. Retrieved 2018-10-05.
Steiner, Kristof (August 30, 2017). "A timeline of Israel's LGBTQ progression". Time Out Israel. Retrieved 2018-10-05.

External links
 Solomont, E.B. "San Francisco festival to showcase Israel’s gay culture " (Archive). Jerusalem Post. 17 April 2010.